Macseal is an American rock band from Farmingdale, New York.

History
Macseal began with the release of a self-titled EP in August 2015. In May 2017, the band released another EP titled Yeah, No, I Know . In 2018, Macseal released an EP titled Map It Out. On November 11, 2019, Macseal released their debut full-length album, Super Enthusiast, on 6131 Records.

Members
Ryan Bartlett (vocals, guitar, keyboards)
Cole Szilagyi (vocals, guitar)
Justin Canavaciol (bass)
Francesca Impastato (drums)

Discography
Studio albums
Super Enthusiast (2019, 6131 Records)

Extended plays
Macseal EP (2015)
etc. (2016)
Yeah, No, I Know (2017)
Map It Out (2018)

References

Rock music groups from New York (state)